Tragocephala alluaudi is a species of beetle in the family Cerambycidae. It was described by Lameere in 1893. It is known from Seychelles.

References

alluaudi
Beetles described in 1893